Text-to-Video  is a state of the art artificial intelligence technology which needs only text as input for the output as video. The inspiration came from text-to-image models which deliver images as output from text as input.

Video prediction on making objects realistic in a stable background is performed by using recurrent neural network for a sequence to sequence model with a connector convolutional neural network encoding and decoding each frame pixel by pixel,  creating video using deep learning.

Methodology 
 Data collection and data set preparation using clear video from kinetic human action video.
 Training the convolutional neural network for making video.
 Keywords extraction from text using natural-language programming .
 Testing of Data set in conditional generative model for existing static and dynamic information from text by variational autoencoder and generative adversarial network.

Models 
There are different models including open source models.  CogVideo presented their code in GitHub. Meta Platforms uses text-to-video with makeavideo.studio.Google used Imagen Video for converting text-to-video.

Antonia Antonova presented another model.

References 

Artificial intelligence
Algorithms
Language
Computers